Please, Don't Touch Anything, later re-released as Please, Don't Touch Anything: Classic on the Nintendo Switch in Europe and North America, is a puzzle video game developed by Russian indie studio Four Quarters and published by Bulkypix and Plug In Digital. It was released on March 26, 2015 on Steam for Windows, Mac OS X and Linux, and on October 21, 2015 for iOS. It received a remake with virtual reality support, Please, Don't Touch Anything 3D, that was co-developed with Escalation Studios and released on December 7, 2016 on Steam for Windows and Mac OS X. An enhanced port of Please, Don't Touch Anything was released for Nintendo Switch on November 22, 2018 with updated graphics and more solutions.

Gameplay 
The player assumes control of the game's main character, who is locked in a mysterious room when their colleague goes for a bathroom break. There is a control panel in front of them, which, despite orders not to touch, they are expected to interfere with to progress the game. The player must study the instructional poster in the room to figure out  how to manipulate the panel, and different combinations of actions can unlock a large number of different endings.

Plot 
The potential endings of the game vary widely, from humorous to the Eye of Providence staring back at the player.

Reception 

The game received generally positive reviews according to Metacritic.

Tyler Wilde of PC Gamer called it an "enjoyable little puzzle box" but "not meaningful", saying that he wished its narrative were more "interesting", similar to games such as Papers, Please or The Stanley Parable.

Rob Rich of Gamezebo said the art style was "pleasant" but the puzzles were "obtuse" and there was "hardly any meat to the gameplay".

Alysia Judge of Pocket Gamer UK awarded the iOS version the website's Silver Award, saying it presented "fun gameplay in a neat pixel art package".

Jed Whitaker of Destructoid said the VR remake was a "steal" for the price and that it would make players "laugh and jump".

See also
 Loop Hero, the second game from Four Quarters

References 

2015 video games
Adventure games
BulkyPix games
Indie video games
IOS games
Linux games
MacOS games
Nintendo Switch games
Plug In Digital games
Puzzle video games
Single-player video games
Video game remakes
Video games developed in Russia
Virtual reality games
Windows games